Batman Airport is an airport in Batman, Turkey .

Airlines and destinations

Traffic statistics

References

External links
Airport Profile

Airports in Turkey
Buildings and structures in Batman Province
Transport in Batman Province